Enrique Cárdenas Del Avellano (born 4 September 1957) is a Mexican politician affiliated with the PRI. He currently serves as Deputy of the LXII Legislature of the Mexican Congress representing Tamaulipas. He also served as Deputy during the LX Legislature.

References

1957 births
Living people
People from Matamoros, Tamaulipas
Members of the Chamber of Deputies (Mexico)
Institutional Revolutionary Party politicians
20th-century Mexican politicians
21st-century Mexican politicians
Politicians from Tamaulipas
Municipal presidents in Tamaulipas
Members of the Congress of Tamaulipas